This is a list of villages in Goraul block, Vaishali district, Bihar state, India.

See also

List of villages in Vaishali district

References

Lists of villages in Vaishali district
Goraul